UN numbers from UN 0001 to UN 0100 as assigned by the United Nations Committee of Experts on the Transport of Dangerous Goods are as follows:


UN 0001 to UN 0100

See also
Lists of UN numbers

References

Lists of UN numbers